Arkansas Highway 377 (AR 377, Hwy. 377) is a north–south state highway in Searcy County, Arkansas. The route of  runs from Highway 16 near Witts Spring north to Highway 74 at Snowball.

Route description
The route begins at AR 16 near Witts Spring and runs north through Magic Springs to AR 74 near Snowball and the Gates-Helm Farm, which is listed on the National Register of Historic Places. The route does not cross or concur with any other state highways.

Major intersections

References

377
Transportation in Searcy County, Arkansas